Kees van Nieuwenhuizen  ( – ) was a Dutch male footballer. He was part of the Netherlands national football team, playing 2 matches. He played his first match on 21 March 1909.

See also
 List of Dutch international footballers

References

1884 births
1981 deaths
Dutch footballers
Netherlands international footballers
Sparta Rotterdam players
Footballers from The Hague
Association footballers not categorized by position